Classic Army (Yick Fung International) is a manufacturer of airsoft replicas based in Hong Kong. It produces automatic electric guns or AEGs, and a small number of GBB (Gas Blowback) pistols. Designed to resemble real firearms, these replicas fire 6mm plastic BBs at safe velocities. Within the airsoft community, Classic Army is often abbreviated as simply "CA."

Classic Army AEG's are characterized by their many metal parts and realism, in that most parts that are metal on the real-steel counterpart are also metal on the replica (although they are usually not cross-compatible). These metal components usually include the frame and body, as well as the firing mechanism (called a "gearbox"). CA replicas also feature pre-upgraded internals such as metal bushings and polycarbonate pistons.

As with most AEGs, Classic Army replicas use rechargeable batteries (either NiMH, NiCd)or more recently LiPo. In an un-modified condition, they can be expected to fire 0.2 g BBs at approximately 280–340 feet per second (FPS).

Products

AEG
Classic Army AEG replicas are available in the following models:

Heckler & Koch G3 based:
SAR Offizier M41  {based on MC51 Rifle}
SAR Offizier M41 FS {based on HK51 Rifle}
SAR Taktik Rifle II {based on G3-SG/1 Rifle}
SAR Sportmatch M41 SG {based on G3A3 Rifle}
SAR Sportmatch M41 ES {based on G3A4 Rifle}
Heckler & Koch HK33 based:
CA33E
CA53 A2
CA33 A3
CA53

Heckler & Koch G36 based:
CA36E Rifle
CA36K Carbine
CA36C Tactical Carbine "Commando"
Heckler & Koch SL8 based CA8-2 Rifle
Heckler & Koch MP5 based (all with B&T Markings):
MP5SD2
MP5SD3
MP5SD5
MP5SD6
MP5A2
MP5A3
MP5A4
MP5A5
MP5A2 with Tactical Lighted Forearm
MP5A3 with Tactical Lighted Forearm
MP5A4 with Tactical Lighted Forearm
MP5A5 with Tactical Lighted Forearm
MP5KA3 
MP5K-PDW
Steyr AUG based:
AUG A1
AUG A2
AK-74 based:
SLR-105 A1
SLR-105 A1 with wood fittings
SLR-105 Steel with wood fittings
SLR-105 Compact with wood fittings
M249 SAW based:
CA249P Para Version
CA249
CA 249 Mk.II
SR-25 based CA-25
M14 based:
M14 Match
M14 Scout
M14 EBR Match
M14 EBR Scout
M16/AR-15 based: (all with ArmaLite markings)
M15A2 Rifle
M15A1 Rifle (based on XM16E1 assault rifle from Vietnam)
M15 XM177 E2
M15A2 Carbine
M15A2 Tactical Carbine
M15A4 Rifle (based on M16A4 assault rifle)
M15A4 SPR (Special Purpose Rifle)
M4 carbine based: (all with ArmaLite markings)
M15A4 SPC (Special Purpose Carbine)
M15A4 CQB (Close Quarters Battle Rifle)
M15A4 Carbine
M15A4 Tactical Carbine
M15A4 RIS (Rail Interface System)
M15A4 RIS Carbine (A new, improved version of the M15A4 RIS, released in 2007)
M15A4 CQB Compact
M15A4 CQB Compact SEAL

FN SCAR based:
Mk-16
Mk-16 C.Q.C.
Mk-17
AR-10 based: AR-10
FN FAL based: DS Arms SA58
AK-47 based:
SA M-7 Classic
SAS M-7 Classic
SA RPK-7
P90 based
CA 90
CA 90 TR
Heckler & Koch HK416 based:
CA 416
CA 416 CQB
UMP based:
UMC
Dragunov SVD (rifle) Based:
Dragunov SVD
LWRC based:
LWRC M6A2
LWRC PSD
M134-A2 Minigun

Classic Army has also released a new series, "Sportline", which forgo the metal bodies of CA's more mainstream AEG's, now known as the "Proline" series.  These guns come with a plastic body, and the other standard equipment included with MPEGs.  This new line is designed to compete with the new MPEG guns coming from Chinese manufacturers, such as Jing Gong, Dboys, CYMA, Kart, and A&K. The Sportline Series includes CA 416 series (based on Heckler & Koch HK416), CA 90 series (based on P90), AUG (based on  Steyr AUG), M15 Series (based on M16 and M4 carbine), MP5 series (based on Heckler & Koch MP5) and SA M7 series (based on Ak-47). 
Even more recently, Classic Army has released metal-bodied sportline models. They have similar bodies to the "proline" models, however, the trademarks are of lesser quality. Many people in the airsoft community say that the Chinese-made clones are a better value than many sportline models.

Spring
 M15A4 Carbine
 M24 Socom Sniper Civilian Type 
 M24 Socom Sniper Military Type

Gas Blow Back

M1911 based: 
CA 1911A1

Glock 17 based:
CA 17

Glock 19 based:
CA 19

Glock 26 based: 
CA26

Future
Classic Army's Future Products Include:
(All are announced but release dates are unknown)
 AUG A3

See also
Classic Army M15 series

External links
 Classic Army Manufacturer's Website

Manufacturing companies of Hong Kong
Airsoft
Companies with year of establishment missing